Cricotopus elegans is a species of non-biting midges in the subfamily Orthocladiinae of the bloodworm family Chironomidae. It is found in Europe.

It mines in the aquatic Potamogeton.

References

External links 
 Cricotopus elegans at insectoid.info

Chironomidae
Insects described in 1943
Nematoceran flies of Europe